This page shows the results of the 2010 Centrobasket Championship for Women, which was held in the city of Mayaguez, Puerto Rico from July 10 to July 14, 2010.

Group stage

Group A

Group B

Knockout stage

Bracket

5th place bracket

Classification 5-8

Semifinals

Seventh place game

Fifth place game

Third place game

Final

Final standings

References
FIBA Americas
Results

Centrobasket Women
2010–11 in North American basketball
2010 in women's basketball
2010 in Puerto Rican sports
International women's basketball competitions hosted by Puerto Rico
2010 in Central American sport
2010 in Caribbean sport